The Encyclopedia of Reagents for Organic Synthesis is published in print and online by John Wiley & Sons Ltd. The online version is also known as e-EROS. The encyclopedia contains a description of the use of reagents used in organic chemistry. The eight-volume print version includes 3500 alphabetically arranged articles and the online version is regularly updated to include new reagents and catalysts.

References

External links 

Print version

Encyclopedias of science
Chemistry books